Tai Wo Hau Estate is a public housing estate in Tai Wo Hau, Kwai Chung, Kwai Tsing District, New Territories, Hong Kong. It has a total of 17 blocks following redevelopment.

Kwai Yin Court is a Home Ownership Scheme court in Tai Wo Hau Estate and opposite to MTR Tai Wo Hau station. It has two blocks built in 1993.

History
After the World War II, a large number of squatter dwellings were built in Tai Wo Hau, on the hill between Tsuen Wan and Kwai Chung, and on the fields of the villages north of Castle Peak Road. The squatter area was cleared in the 1960s for the construction of the Tai Wo Hau Resettlement Estate. The resettlement blocks were cleared between the 1970s and 80s. The current blocks were built between 1979 and 1993.

Houses

Tai Wo Hau Estate

Kwai Yin Court

Demographics
According to the 2016 by-census, Tai Wo Hau Estate had a population of 20,848. The median age was 47.7 and the majority of residents (96.2 per cent) were of Chinese ethnicity. The average household size was 2.7 people. The median monthly household income of all households (i.e. including both economically active and inactive households) was HK$21,280.

Politics
For the 2019 District Council election, the estate fell within two constituencies. Most of the estate and Kwai Yin Court are located in the Lower Tai Wo Hau constituency, which was formerly represented by Wong Bing-kuen until July 2021, while the remainder of the estate falls within the Upper Tai Wo Hau constituency, which was formerly represented by Hui Kei-cheung until July 2021.

See also
Public housing estates in Kwai Chung

References

Kwai Chung
Public housing estates in Hong Kong